Turkey competed at the 1992 Summer Paralympics in Barcelona, Spain. There was only one competitor from Turkey, who won no medals, and so, did not place in the medal table.

See also 
 Turkey at the Paralympics
 Turkey at the 1992 Summer Olympics

References 

Nations at the 1992 Summer Paralympics
1992
Summer Paralympics